Beyarjomand Rural District is a rural district (dehestan) in Beyarjomand District, Shahrud County, Semnan Province, Iran. At the 2006 census, its population was 2,023, in 737 families.  The rural district has 10 villages.

References 

Rural Districts of Semnan Province
Shahrud County